Damon Allen (born 1963) is a retired Canadian Football League quarterback.

Damon Allen  may also refer to:
 Damon Allen (figure skater), American former competitive figure skater
 Damon Allen, founding member of rock band Shurman

See also
Allen (surname)